is a railway station on the Hokuriku Main Line  in the Hinodecho neighbourhood of the city of Sabae, Fukui Prefecture, Japan, operated by the West Japan Railway Company (JR West).

Lines

Station layout
The station consists of one side platform and one island platform connected by a footbridge. The station has a Midori no Madoguchi staffed ticket office.

Platforms

Adjacent stations

History
Sabae Station opened on 15 July 1896.  With the privatization of Japanese National Railways (JNR) on 1 April 1987, the station came under the control of JR West.

Passenger statistics
In fiscal 2016, the station was used by an average of 2,263 passengers daily (boarding passengers only).

Surrounding area
Hirose Hospital
Site of Sabae Domain jin'ya

See also
 List of railway stations in Japan

References

External links
 
  

Railway stations in Fukui Prefecture
Stations of West Japan Railway Company
Railway stations in Japan opened in 1896
Hokuriku Main Line
Sabae, Fukui